James Roger Johnston (18 June 1930 – 24 June 2020) was an Australian politician. Johnston successfully sought Liberal preselection for Hotham, competing against nine other members.  In 1977, he was elected to the Australian House of Representatives as the Liberal member for Hotham. He was a member of the Parliamentary Yacht Club, along with Phillip Lynch, Alan Cadman and Marshall Baillieu. In 1979, Johnston was part of a delegation of Australian parliamentarians sent to Port Moresby to learn about resources development. He was defeated in 1980. He attempted to gain preselection for the 1982 Flinders by-election.

Johnston is a great-grandson of David Syme, and his ashes are interred in David Syme's tomb situated in Boroondara Cemetery in Kew, Victoria.

References

1930 births
2020 deaths
Liberal Party of Australia members of the Parliament of Australia
Members of the Australian House of Representatives for Hotham
Members of the Australian House of Representatives
20th-century Australian politicians
Politicians from Melbourne